Same-sex marriage in Missouri has been legal since the U.S. Supreme Court's landmark ruling in Obergefell v. Hodges, which struck down state bans on marriages between two people of the same sex on June 26, 2015. Prior to the court ruling, the state recognized same-sex marriages from other jurisdictions pursuant to a state court ruling in October 2014, and certain jurisdictions of the state performed same-sex marriage despite a statewide ban.

On November 5, 2014, a state court ruling striking down Missouri's same-sex marriage ban ordered St. Louis to issue marriage licenses to same-sex couples. In response to this ruling, St. Louis County also began issuing marriage licenses to same-sex couples. On November 7, 2014, a federal court ruling striking down Missouri's same-sex marriage ban stayed its order directing Jackson County to issue licenses to same-sex couples. Despite the stay, Jackson County began issuing marriage licenses to same-sex couples immediately following the ruling. Assessing the state of same-sex marriage litigation in December 2014, Marc Solomon of Freedom to Marry said, "Missouri is the most complex state on this issue."

Restrictions on same-sex unions
In August 2004, 71% of Missouri voters ratified Amendment 2, which restricted the validity and recognition of marriage in Missouri to the "union of one man and one woman". State statutes also banned same-sex marriage.

In December 2022, Representative Chris Sander introduced a constitutional amendment to repeal the ban. Sander said, "My intent with the language is to have the Missouri Constitution in line with federal law because I believe federal law is the correct ruling. This country has a history of saying who can't get married in an ugly way." The amendment requires approval in both the Senate and the House of Representatives before being placed on the ballot for approval by voters.

Recognition of same-sex marriages from other jurisdictions
Missouri statutes prohibited the recognition of same-sex marriages validity performed in other jurisdictions. This provision is now unenforceable.

On November 14, 2013, Governor Jay Nixon issued an executive order allowing same-sex couples married in other jurisdictions to file a combined Missouri income tax return if they file their federal return jointly. Four conservatives, three associated with the Missouri Baptist Convention and one a former St. Charles County Executive associated with Focus on the Family, filed Messer v. Nixon in Cole County Circuit Court on January 8, 2014, seeking to prevent the practice. The lawsuit was unsuccessful.

Barrier v. Vasterling
The American Civil Liberties Union (ACLU) filed a lawsuit, Barrier v. Vasterling, challenging the state's refusal to recognize same-sex marriages from other jurisdictions in state circuit court on February 11, 2014, on behalf of eight same-sex couples, later joined by two more. Oral arguments were held on September 2 before Judge J. Dale Youngs in the Jackson County Circuit Court in Kansas City. On October 3, Judge Youngs ruled that Missouri's refusal to recognize same-sex marriages from other jurisdictions violated the plaintiffs' right to equal protection under both the state and federal constitutions. He ordered the state to recognize such marriages and held the state responsible for the plaintiffs' legal expenses. On October 6, the Missouri Attorney General, Chris Koster, announced the state would not appeal the decision. Members of the Missouri General Assembly sought to intervene in the suit and appeal the decision, but the court rejected their petition as filed too late for the court to act.

Lawsuits

Federal cases

Lawson v. Kelly
In June 2014, Jackson County denied marriage licenses to two same-sex couples, which provided, according to Jackson County Executive Mike Sanders, a better vehicle for a lawsuit than the St. Louis case. On June 24, the ACLU filed Lawson v. Kelly in Jackson County circuit court on behalf of the two same-sex couples who had been denied marriage licenses there. Jackson County officials said it was up to the Attorney General to defend the state's position. Attorney General Koster intervened and had the case moved to federal district court. U.S. District Court Judge Ortrie D. Smith ruled for the plaintiffs on November 7, finding that Missouri's ban denied the plaintiffs their fundamental right to marry and discriminated against them on the basis of gender, but not on the basis of sexual orientation. He ordered only Jackson County to issue marriage licenses to same-sex couples and stayed his order pending conclusion of any appeal. Despite the stay, Jackson County began issuing marriage licenses to same-sex couples immediately following the decision. On November 21, the plaintiffs asked Judge Smith to lift his stay given that St. Louis had been ordered to issue marriage licenses to same-sex couples in State of Missouri v. Florida and noting that the state took no position on the request. He refused on November 25, noting that licenses might be issued "that could later be determined to have been issued in error" if his decision was reversed.

Attorney General Koster filed a notice of appeal in the Eighth Circuit Court of Appeals on December 5. On December 8, the same-sex couples also filed a notice of appeal to contest the district court's rejection of their claim of discrimination on the basis of sexual orientation.

On December 10, the couples asked the Eighth Circuit to vacate the district court's stay or hear their appeal on an expedited basis. On December 20, the couples asked the Eighth Circuit to consider their request to vacate the stay in light of the U.S. Supreme Court's refusal the previous day to grant a stay in a Florida case, Armstrong v. Brenner. The state replied to the couples' motion on December 24, calling the request for expedited consideration premature given the likelihood that in January the U.S. Supreme Court would agree to hear a same-sex marriage case. The state's brief did not mention the district court's stay. On January 9, 2015, the couples asked the Eighth Circuit for a "prompt ruling" on their request, noting that the state had offered no argument against lifting the stay and that the Supreme Court had not accepted a petition for certiorari in a same-sex marriage case that day. They wrote: "there is no equitable reason to hold the current case in perpetual limbo". On January 21, the state asked the court to suspend proceedings pending action by the U.S. Supreme Court in similar same-sex marriage cases. The couples supported that request only if the court lifted the stay. On January 22, the court refused both to lift the stay and to suspend proceedings. It agreed to expedite the case. On February 9, the plaintiff couples again asked the Eighth Circuit to lift the stay, citing the Supreme Court's refusal to grant a stay in Searcy v. Strange, a same-sex marriage case from Alabama.

Obergefell v. Hodges
On June 26, 2015, following the U.S. Supreme Court's decision in Obergefell v. Hodges that same-sex marriage bans violate the Due Process and Equal Protection clauses of the Fourteenth Amendment, the plaintiffs asked the Eighth Circuit to lift the stay, and the state asked the court to dismiss its appeal of the district court decision. As a result, same-sex couples began immediately marrying throughout Missouri. On July 7, 2015, Governor Jay Nixon issued "Executive Order 15-04", ordering all state departments and agencies to immediately take all necessary measures to ensure compliance with the Obergefell decision.

State cases

State of Missouri v. Florida
In June 2014, St. Louis officials licensed four same-sex marriages in order to provide the basis for a lawsuit when the state ordered them to stop the practice. St. Louis Circuit Judge Rex Burlison held a hearing in the suit, originally State of Missouri v. Carpenter, on September 29 in state circuit court. He ruled in favor of the plaintiffs on November 5, ruling that Missouri's refusal to license same-sex marriages violated the Missouri and federal constitutions. Attorney General Koster announced plans to appeal the ruling to the Missouri Supreme Court, but not to seek a stay of the ruling's implementation because "[f]ollowing decisions in Idaho and Alaska, the United States Supreme Court has refused to grant stays on identical facts." Attorney General Koster and the Recorders' Association of Missouri said Judge Burlison's order only applied to the city of St. Louis, where the city's marriage license department began issuing marriage licenses to same-sex couples. St. Louis County, where an official said "We believe it's a county-by-county decision", began issuing marriage licenses to same-sex couples the next day.

In re Marriage of M.S.
After a circuit court in St. Louis County denied him a divorce sua sponte, a man married in Iowa to a man now incarcerated in a Missouri prison appealed to the Missouri Supreme Court on March 13, 2014, which heard oral arguments on December 3. The state Supreme Court reversed the lower court's decision on February 10, 2015, holding that the circuit court had subject-matter jurisdiction because the plain language of the Missouri Constitution provides that Missouri circuit courts have jurisdiction over all civil cases and matters (and a petition for dissolution of marriage is a civil case), and remanded the case back to the lower court.

In February 2014, a Boone County judge granted a divorce to two women, Dena and Samantha Latimer, who had married in Massachusetts in 2009.

Marriage statistics
The Missouri Department of Health and Senior Services has collected data on the number of same-sex marriages performed in Missouri since 2016, as shown in the table below. Jackson County, St. Louis County and St. Louis together account for about half of all Missouri same-sex marriages, with Greene, St. Charles, Boone, Clay, Jasper, Jefferson and Cape Girardeau counties together accounting for about one-fourth. As of 2019, no same-sex marriage has taken place in Montgomery, Oregon and Shelby counties.

Data for 2015 is incomplete as several counties continued to issue licenses with the terms "groom" and "bride" until they were updated for 2016. The state recorded 471 marriages between two women and 255 marriages between two men in 2015. The median age at marriage was higher for same-sex spouses than for opposite-sex spouses in 2015, at 39.9 years to 30.3 years.

Public opinion
{| class="wikitable"
|+style="font-size:100%" | Public opinion for same-sex marriage in Missouri
|-
! style="width:190px;"| Poll source
! style="width:200px;"| Date(s)administered
! class=small | Samplesize
! Margin oferror
! style="width:100px;"| % support
! style="width:100px;"| % opposition
! style="width:40px;"| % no opinion
|-
| Public Religion Research Institute
| align=center| March 8–November 9, 2021
| align=center| ?
| align=center| ?
|  align=center| 65%
| align=center| 35%
| align=center| <0.5%
|-
| Public Religion Research Institute
| align=center| January 7–December 20, 2020
| align=center| 816 random telephoneinterviewees
| align=center| ?
|  align=center| 62%
| align=center| 33%
| align=center| 5%
|-
| Public Religion Research Institute
| align=center| April 5–December 23, 2017
| align=center| 1,505 random telephoneinterviewees
| align=center| ?
|  align=center| 58%
| align=center| 35%
| align=center| 7%
|-
| Public Religion Research Institute
| align=center| May 18, 2016–January 10, 2017
| align=center| 2,171 random telephoneinterviewees
| align=center| ?
|  align=center| 51%
| align=center| 41%
| align=center| 8%
|-
| Public Religion Research Institute
| align=center| April 29, 2015–January 7, 2016
| align=center| 1,761 random telephoneinterviewees
| align=center| ?
|  align=center| 48%
| align=center| 45%
| align=center| 7%
|-
| New York Times/CBS News/YouGov
| align=center| September 20–October 1, 2014
| align=center| 1,226 likely voters
| align=center| ± 3.6%
| align=center| 41%
|  align=center| 47%
| align=center| 13%
|-
| Public Policy Polling
| align=center| May 24–27, 2012
| align=center| 602 voters
| align=center| ± 4%
| align=center| 36%
|  align=center| 52%
| align=center| 12%
|-
| Public Policy Polling
| align=center| September 9–12, 2011
| align=center| 632 voters
| align=center| ± 3.9%
| align=center| 32%
|  align=center| 59%
| align=center| 9%
|-

See also
LGBT rights in Missouri
Same-sex marriage in the United States

References

External links
 Lawson v. Kelly, U.S. District Court for the Western District of Missouri, November 7, 2014
 State of Missouri v. Florida, Missouri Circuit Court 22nd Judicial Circuit, November 5, 2014
 Barrier v. Vasterling, Circuit Court of Jackson County, Missouri, October 3, 2014

2014 in LGBT history
2015 in LGBT history
Missouri
LGBT rights in Missouri
2014 in Missouri
2015 in Missouri